Adams Branch is a  tributary of Richardson Creek in south-central North Carolina that rises in Union County near Alton, North Carolina and then flows generally north through Union County to Richardson Creek.


Maps

See also
List of North Carolina rivers

References

Rivers of North Carolina
Rivers of Union County, North Carolina
Tributaries of the Pee Dee River